Almon is a surname. Notable people with the surname include:

 April Capone Almon (born c. 1975), American businesswoman and politician
 Baylee Almon, baby victim of the Oklahoma City bombing
 Bill Almon (born 1952), American former Major League Baseball player
 Edward B. Almon (1860–1933), American politician
 John Almon (1737–1805), English journalist and writer
 Leroy Almon (1938–1997), American artist known for his woodcarvings and paintings
 Marc Almon, Canadian filmmaker
 Marie Almon, former chief dietitian at Mount Sinai Medical Center in Miami Beach, Florida, who helped create the South Beach Diet
 Mather Byles Almon (1796–1871), Canadian banker, politician and philanthropist
 Shirley Montag Almon (1935–1975), American economist
 Sophie Margaretta Almon Hensley (1866–1946), née Almon, Canadian writer and educator
 William Bruce Almon (1787–1840), doctor and politician in Halifax, Nova Scotia
 William James Almon (1755–1817), doctor and loyalist, father of William Bruce Almon
 William Johnston Almon (1816–1901), Nova Scotian physician and Canadian politician, son of William Bruce Almon

See also
 Robert McAlmon (1895–1956), American writer, poet and publisher
 Terry MacAlmon (born 1955), American Christian singer, songwriter and musician